PNTM may refer to:

Peru's Next Top Model
Philippines' Next Top Model
Top Model. Zostań modelką, also known as Poland's Next Top Model

(all three Top Model franchises based from America's Next Top Model)